Selham railway station served the village of Selham in the county of West Sussex in England. The station was out in mostly open fields, although a public house was located nearby. The station was on the Pulborough to Midhurst line which was originally part of the London Brighton and South Coast Railway. The station opened after the line (which opened in 1866) on 1 July 1872. The station was closed to passenger services in 1955, but freight was still carried up to May 1963, before the station was closed completely. The line through the station remained open for another year serving Midhurst. The station building is now a private home.

References

 

Disused railway stations in West Sussex
Railway stations in Great Britain opened in 1872
Railway stations in Great Britain closed in 1955
Former London, Brighton and South Coast Railway stations
1866 establishments in England